Bhadgaon is the municipal council in Jalgaon district, Maharashtra.

History
The Bhadgaon municipal council established in 2015.

Municipal Council election

Electoral performance 2015

References 

Municipal councils in Maharashtra
Jalgaon district